This is a list of the biota of the Burgess Shale, a Cambrian lagerstätte located in Yoho National Park in Canada.

The Burgess Shale is a fossil-bearing deposit exposed in the Canadian Rockies of British Columbia, Canada. It is famous for the exceptional preservation of the soft parts of its fossils. At 508 million years old (middle Cambrian), it is one of the earliest fossil beds containing soft-part imprints.

Paleobiota

Arthropoda 
Crown-group arthropods (euarthropods such as trilobites) are extremely diverse and some species are abundant in the Burgess Shale. Along with their earlier-diverging cousins, the "Lobopodians", they provide great information on early Panarthropod evolution.

Lobopodians 
Lobopodians, a grouping of worm-like panarthropods from which arthropods arose from, were present in the shale.

Sponges 
Sponges (Porifera) were extremely diverse in the shale, with many of them belonging to the class Demospongiae.

Comb-jellies (Ctenophora) 
Ctenophores, also known as comb jellies, are rare in the shale, but three genera are known from the site.

Cyanobacteria 
Cyanobacteria are photosynthesizers, and would have been important in the shale.

Red algae (Rhodophyta) 
Red algae are found in the shale, with three genera being known.

Hemichordata 
Many of the Hemichordates from the shale have either remained enigmatic, or were once classified under other groupings.

Annelida 
A number of different Annelid worms are known from the shale.

Priapulida 
Various stem-group priapulids are known from the Burgess Shale.

Mollusca 
The molluscs of the Burgess shale are diverse in body shapes, the ecological niches they filled, and there enigmatic qualities.

Brachiopods 
Many of the brachiopods from the site are members of the class Lingulata.

Cnidaria 
A wide variety of cnidarians like scyphozoans and conulariids are known from this site.

Echinodermata 
The echinoderms of the shale represent extinct groups distantly related to extant groups.

Chordata 
Chordates are very rare in the shale, but the two that are known are possibly being very important in the study of these creatures earlier evolution.

Gnathifera

Chancellorids 
An extinct group of sponge-like animals covered in hollow spines

Incertae sedis and miscellaneous 
This section documents organisms from the shale whose taxonomic affinities are not fully understood, or who do not fit into any of the above groups.

References 

Burgess Shale
Burgess Shale fossils